Stepmom is an informal variation of stepmother.

It may also refer to:

 Stepmom (1973 film), a Soviet film directed by Oleg Bondaryov
 Stepmom (1998 film), an American film directed by Chris Columbus

See also 
 The Stepmother (disambiguation)